Haliotis mykonosensis is a species of sea snail, a marine gastropod mollusk in the family Haliotidae, the abalones.

Description
The size of the shell varies between 25 mm and 50 mm.

Distribution
This species occurs in the Mediterranean Sea from Italy and Corsica west to Greece and western Turkey.

References

 Owen B., Hanavan S. & Hall S. (2001). A new species of abalone (Haliotis) from Greece. The Veliger 44(3): 301–309
 Geiger D.L. & Owen B. (2012) Abalone: Worldwide Haliotidae. Hackenheim: Conchbooks. viii + 361 pp. [29 February 2012] page(s): 130

External links
 

mykonosensis
Gastropods described in 2001

Molluscs of the Mediterranean Sea